Villa de Leales is a settlement in Tucumán Province in northern Argentina. It has approximately 3,000 inhabitants. It has a 225-year-old church and a castle on the banks of the river dating to around 1890. There are many different businesses in Villa de Leales, including hotels, cinemas, locksmiths, masonry, and restaurants among other businesses.

External links 
 Townsoftheworld

Populated places in Tucumán Province